Houston Air Route Traffic Control Center (ZHU) is located at George Bush Intercontinental Airport at 16600 JFK Boulevard, Houston, Texas, United States 77032. The Houston ARTCC is one of 22 Air Route Traffic Control Centers in the United States. Houston Center is the 9th busiest ARTCC in the United States. 

The center controls airspace in southern Texas, Louisiana, southern Mississippi, southwestern Alabama, and areas in the Gulf of Mexico.

Airports served by the Houston ARTCC

Commercial airports 
 Alabama
 Mobile Regional Airport (Mobile) 
 Louisiana
 Alexandria International Airport (Rapides Parish, near Alexandria) 
 Baton Rouge Metropolitan Airport (Baton Rouge) 
 Lafayette Regional Airport (Lafayette) 
 Lake Charles Regional Airport (Calcasieu Parish, near Lake Charles) 
 Louis Armstrong New Orleans International Airport (Kenner, near New Orleans)
 Mississippi
 Gulfport-Biloxi International Airport (Gulfport) 
 Texas
 Austin-Bergstrom International Airport (Austin) 
 Southeast Texas Regional Airport (Port Arthur, near Beaumont) 
 Brownsville/South Padre Island International Airport (Brownsville) 
 Easterwood Field (College Station) 
 Corpus Christi International Airport (Corpus Christi) 
 Del Rio International Airport (Del Rio) 
 Valley International Airport (Harlingen) 
 George Bush Intercontinental Airport (Houston) 
 William P. Hobby Airport (Houston) 
 Laredo International Airport (Laredo) 
 McAllen-Miller International Airport (McAllen) 
 San Antonio International Airport (San Antonio) 
 Scholes International Airport (Galveston) 
 Victoria Regional Airport (Victoria)

Airspace control

See also

References

External links
Houston ARTCC (FAA)
Houston Center Weather Service Unit (CWSU) (NWS/FAA)

Air traffic control centers
Air traffic control in the United States
Air Route
WAAS reference stations
Aviation in Texas
Traffic Control Center